East Providence High School is a public high school located in East Providence, Rhode Island. It instructs grade levels 9 through 12 and is operated by the East Providence School Department. As of the 2014-15 year, there was an approximate student population of 1,500 students.

History

1952 - 2021 building 

The old East Providence High School opened its doors in 1952 as East Providence Senior High School. It replaced the original 1884 school building on Broadway that later became Central Junior High School. It was one of the first modern high schools built during the early 1950s that deviated from previous architectural styles. The construction included amenities such as a modernized cafeteria and auditorium to accommodate 1,000 occupants as well as a swimming pool with adjoining training and full size gymnasiums. During construction of the school, a clock tower was built on campus and has since become an iconic symbol of East Providence High. In 1999 a new wing was built as well as an expansion to the existing cafeteria. Neighboring the school is the East Providence Career and Technical Center which is contiguous with East Providence High School and is included in the study programs of some students.

2021 building 
June 5, 2019, ground was broken for the creation of a new high school. The building is expected to not exceed $189.5 million, and scheduled to open in 2021. The "304,000 square-foot, four-story facility, with capacity for 1,600 students in grades 9-12". The East Providence Career and Technical Center will be integrated into the new high school and the previous building will become an administration building. The new building features 45 classrooms, 10 science labs and two greenhouses with expanded work areas for the graphic design, culinary arts, allied health, and construction programs. There will be an "expanded and renovated athletics facilities, including a lighted football stadium with synthetic turf and halftime facilities, track, tennis courts, and fields for baseball, softball, soccer, and lacrosse."

The old building was demolished in August 2021. The new building opened in September 2021, during the COVID-19 pandemic, and features an advanced air filtration system in addition to new classrooms, cafeteria, auditoriums and athletic fields.

Activities 
East Providence High School's Townie Athletics consists of various seasonal sport teams along with seasonal after-school activities and clubs. East Providence High School includes the following sports and activities.

Fall activities 
Football Cheerleading
Marching Band and Color Guard
Boys Cross Country
Girls Cross Country
Girls Soccer
Boys Soccer
Girls Tennis
Girls Volleyball

Winter activities 
Boys Basketball
Girls Basketball
Hockey/Wrestling Cheerleading
Boys Indoor Track
Girls Indoor Track
Swimming
Wrestling
Hockey

Spring activities 
Baseball
Golf
Boys Outdoor Track
Girls Outdoor Track
Softball
Boys Tennis
Boys Volleyball
Boys Lacrosse
Girls Lacrosse

Other activities 
Cyber Patriot
Choral Ensemble
Fashion Club
Talent Show
DECA
Student Council
Band (Marching, wind ensemble, Concert, freshman, and Jazz)
 Book Club
Chess Club
Choraleers
Crimson Yearbook
Environmental Club
Flag Corps
French Club
Freshman Chorus
Class of 2015
Class of 2016
Class of 2017
Class of 2018
Class of 2019
Gay-Straight Alliance
International Club
Meistersingers
Musical
National Honor Society
Photography Club
Portuguese Club
Rhode Island Honor Society
Rhode Island Skills USA
Spanish Club
The Townie Newspaper
The Townie Volunteer Corps
Youth Alive
Young Democrats Club
Young Republicans Club

Alumni 
Jamie Silva, former Indianapolis Colts safety
Claudia Jordan, case holder on Deal or No Deal
David Franklin, Ph.D. Scientist, Entrepreneur
Kim Schifino of Matt & Kim
Jennifer Lee, co-writer of Disney's Wreck-It Ralph and co-director of Frozen.
Pedro Braz, former professional soccer player

Media
East Providence High School and its former principal Dr. Caswell were featured on the scripted reality TruTV series The Principal's Office

References

External links
East Providence High School Website
Townie Athletics
East Providence School Department

Schools in Providence County, Rhode Island
Public high schools in Rhode Island
1884 establishments in Rhode Island
Buildings and structures in East Providence, Rhode Island